The 2022 season was the 20th season in the history of Sport Club Corinthians Paulista's women team. In addition to the domestic league, Corinthians participated in this season's editions of the Supercopa do Brasil, Copa Libertadores Femenina, Campeonato Paulista and Copa Paulista. Corinthians was coming off a successful 2021 campaign by being the first Brazilian women's club to win the continental treble after winning the league, Copa Libertadores Femenina, and Campeonato Paulista. There was a mid-season break due to the 2022 Copa América Femenina.

Background

Kits
 Home (26 April 2022 onward): White shirt, black shorts and white socks;
 Away (8 May 2022 onward): Black shirt, white shorts and black socks;
 Third (7 October 2022 onward): Beige shirt with shodô stripes, black shorts and beige socks;

Previous Kits
 Home (Until 25 April 2022): White shirt, black shorts and white socks;
 Away (Until 7 May 2022): Black with white stripes shirt, white shorts and black socks;
 Third (Until 6 October 2022): Purple shirt, purple shorts and purple socks.

Squad

Transfers

Transfers in

Loans in

Transfers out

Loans out

Squad statistics

Overview

Supercopa do Brasil

Campeonato Brasileiro

First stage

Knockout stages

Campeonato Paulista

First stage

Copa Paulista
After finishing in fifth place, Corinthians participated in the Copa Paulista. The competition featured the four teams that ended the Campeonato Paulista between 5th and 8th place.

Copa Libertadores

Group stage

Knockout stages

See also
List of Sport Club Corinthians Paulista (women) seasons

Notes

References

External links

Sport Club Corinthians Paulista seasons
Corinthians